This is a list of real-life London pubs that are depicted in works of fiction. Pubs play a prominent role in British culture, with their portrayal in literature dating back at least as far as the time of Chaucer, and London's rich history of being used as a setting for literary works means this has continued into the 21st century.

The list is divided into pubs that appear under their real names and pubs that are either portrayed using close pseudonyms or whose description or location have led to speculation as to which establishments they were based on.

Pubs depicted under their real names

Pubs depicted using pseudonyms or otherwise believed to be the basis for fictional portrayals

Sources

See also
List of fictional bars and pubs

References

Lists of places in London
Alcohol in England
British literature